Dr.Parvathamma Rajkumar (6 December 1939 – 31 May 2017) was an Indian film producer and distributor. She was the wife of veteran Kannada actor Dr. Rajkumar. She produced successful films featuring Rajkumar and their sons Shiva Rajkumar, Puneeth Rajkumar and Raghavendra Rajkumar under the production house named "Poornima Enterprises". Actresses who found fame in her productions include Malashri, Prema, Rakshita, Sudha Rani and Ramya.
She was awarded a doctorate from Bangalore University.

Amongst the awards she has received are the Phalke Academy award, Kannada Rajyotsava and a lifetime achievement award from the Government of Karnataka. By 2012, she had produced 80 films. She has spoken in defence of Kannadigas, regarding Karnataka's position in interstate water disputes and against infringement of the Kannada film industry's works.

Early life and family
Parvathamma was born in Saligrama of Mysore district of the erstwhile Kingdom of Mysore on 6 December 1939 to Appaji Gowda and Lakshmamma, as the second of eight children. Singanallur Puttaswamaiah, her future father-in-law, reportedly placed a silver coin in her cradle and vowed to make her his daughter-in-law. Aged 14, she married his son future matinée idol Rajkumar on 25 June 1953. They have five children together: sons Shiva, Raghavendra and Puneeth, and daughters Lakshmi and Poornima. Rajkumar died on 12 April 2006 of cardiac arrest. Her son Puneeth died on 29 October 2021 of cardiac arrest.

Parvathamma was taken to MS Ramaiah Memorial Hospital on 14 May 2017 to treat her for weakness. On 17 May, she was shifted to the intensive care unit after she had difficulty in breathing and was on assisted ventilation, following which a tracheotomy was performed on her to ease breathing. Also, she had developed metastasis despite having been treated for a malignancy a few years previously. She had a cardiac arrest at 4:30 a.m. (IST) on 31 May 2017. Efforts to revive her failed and she was pronounced dead at 4:40 a.m. (IST). It was reported that "malignancy had spread to the lungs and liver".

Film career
She established a family firm for film production called Sri Vajreshwari Combines or Poornima enterprises. The first movie she produced was Trimurthi with her husband in a lead role; Trimurthi was a great success. Her brothers S.A. Chinne Gowda, S.A. Govindaraj, and S.A. Srinivas are also film producers.

She has produced over 80 films and launched her three sons as film stars. Her most successful films with her husband in a lead role include Trimurthy, Haalu Jenu, Kaviratna Kalidasa and Jeevana Chaitra. She produced Anand, Om, Janumada Jodi and several other movies with her oldest son Shiv Rajkumar in lead role. Her son Raghavendra Rajkumar played the lead in Chiranjeevi Sudhakar, Nanjundi Kalyana, Swasthik and Tuvvi Tuvvi Tuvvi. Her youngest son Puneeth starred in Appu, Abhi and Hudugaru.

Filmography

Rajkumar in lead role

Shiva Rajkumar in lead role

Raghavendra Rajkumar in lead role

Puneeth Rajkumar in lead role

Vinay Rajkumar in lead role

Awards
 2016 - Padmabhushan Dr. B. Saroja Devi National Award
 2007 - Rajyotsava Prashasti from Karnataka Government.
 Suvarna Award – Contribution to Kannada Cinema.

Karnataka State Film Awards
 1982–83: First Best Film — Haalu Jenu
 1992–93: First Best Film — Jeevana Chaitra
 1999–2000: Special Film of Social Concern — Shabdavedhi
 2007–08: Dr. Vishnuvardhan Lifetime Achievement Award

Filmfare Awards South
 1985: Best Film (Kannada):  Bettada Hoovu
 1986: Best Film (Kannada): Bhagyada Lakshmi Baramma
 1996: Best Film (Kannada): Janumada Jodi
 2010: Best Film (Kannada): Jackie

See also
 Rajkumar filmography

Notes

External links
 
 Shivaraj Kumar: 25 years of successful acting – Along with her mother: Parvathamma Rajkumar
 Love is life – By Deepa Ganesh
 Biography of Rajkumar

1939 births
2017 deaths
Film producers from Bangalore
Kannada film producers
People from Mysore district
Indian women film producers
Women artists from Karnataka
20th-century Indian businesspeople
Businesswomen from Karnataka
20th-century Indian businesswomen
Recipients of the Rajyotsava Award 2007
Rajkumar family